Dhawal Shamsher Rana is a Nepalese politician, belonging to the Rastriya Prajatantra Party. Shumsher is the former mayor of Nepalgunj Sub-metropolitan City in Banke.

Rana is the current general secretary of Rastriya Prajatantra Party elected from the 2021 general convention of Rastriya Prajatantra Party.

References 

Living people
Rastriya Prajatantra Party politicians
Nepal MPs 2022–present
1962 births